Antoni Baranowski of Clan Ostoja (1760-after 1821), general major of the royal army, patriot.

Baranowski was born 1760 in Indykow and origin from old Polish noble family that was part of the Clan of Ostoja.
He studied from 1772 in the Corps of Cadets in Warsaw, from 1780 in the 5th Front Rifle Regiment and in 1788 he became Captain in the same regiment. From 1790 mayor in the Military Commissariat.

He remained in this function during the rule of Targowica being on duty as a liner. In Lublin he joined the Kościuszko Uprising as one of the first reported adherence to the uprising of 1794. Awarded by the Tadeusz Kościuszko  with the promotion to the rank of general, he commanded the Division (incomplete), protecting the line of the Vistula-Wieprz rivers, which then was incorporated into the Corps of prince Adam Poniński (d. 1816).

Baranowski participated as the head of the division in the Battle of Maciejowice. Subsequently remained off-duty, in 1812 he organized levée en masse in Lublin and Siedlce. From 1821 active in the Masonic movement (Freemasonry).

See also

 Ostoja coat of arms
 Clan of Ostoja

References 

1760 births
19th-century deaths
Polish generals
18th-century Polish nobility
Clan of Ostoja
19th-century Polish nobility
18th-century Polish–Lithuanian military personnel
19th-century Polish military personnel